Horalky is a Slovak wafer biscuit with peanut filling and cocoa coating made by I.D.C. Holding, a.s. under the Sedita brand. It is the bestselling wafer of all time in the Czech Republic and Slovakia since 1965. Horalky was introduced in Poland in 2007 (in 2012 the name was changed to a more Polish version, Góralki), and in Hungary in late 2008 (in 2016 the name was changed to Moments).

The word horalky is a diminutive for the horec (gentian) flower depicted on the wrapper of the wafer, along with the Plesnivec (edelweiss) flower.

External links 
I.D.C. Holding
Horalky USA, Canada
Chocolate bars
Slovak brands
Slovak snack foods
Czech snack foods